Electrofuels, also known as e-fuels, a class of synthetic fuels, are a type of drop-in replacement fuel. They are manufactured using captured carbon dioxide or carbon monoxide, together with hydrogen obtained from sustainable electricity sources such as wind, solar and nuclear power.

The process uses carbon dioxide in manufacturing and releases around the same amount of carbon dioxide into the air when the fuel is burned, for an overall low carbon footprint. Electrofuels are thus an option for reducing greenhouse gas emissions from transport, particularly for long-distance freight, marine, and air transport.

The primary targets are butanol, and biodiesel, but include other alcohols and carbon-containing gases such as methane and butane.

Research
A primary source of funding for research on liquid electrofuels for transportation was the Electrofuels Program of the Advanced Research Projects Agency-Energy (ARPA-E), headed by Eric Toone. ARPA-E, created in 2009 under President Obama’s Secretary of Energy Steven Chu, is the Department of Energy’s (DOE) attempt to duplicate the effectiveness of the Defense Advanced Research Projects Agency, DARPA.  Examples of projects funded under this program include OPX Biotechnologies’ biodiesel effort led by Michael Lynch and Derek Lovley’s work on microbial electrosynthesis at the University of Massachusetts Amherst, which reportedly produced the first liquid electrofuel using CO2 as the feedstock. Descriptions of all ARPA-E Electrofuels Program research projects can be found at the ARPA-E Electrofuels Program website.

The first Electrofuels Conference, sponsored by the American Institute of Chemical Engineers was held in Providence, RI in November 2011. At that conference, Director Eric Toone stated that "Eighteen months into the program, we know it works. We need to know if we can make it matter." Several groups are beyond proof-of-principle, and are working to scale up cost-effectively.

Electrofuels have the potential to be disruptive if carbon-neutral electrofuels are cheaper than petroleum fuels, and if chemical feedstocks produced by electrosynthesis are cheaper than those refined from crude oil. Electrofuels also has significant potential in altering the renewable energy landscape, as electrofuels allows renewables from all sources to be stored conveniently as a liquid fuel.

, prompted by the fracking boom, ARPA-E's focus has moved from electrical feedstocks to natural-gas based feedstocks, and thus away from electrofuels.

Towards the end of 2020, Porsche announced its investment in electrofuels, including the Haru Oni project in Chile, creating synthetic methanol from wind power. In 2021, Audi announced that it was working on e-diesel and e-gasoline projects. British company Zero, which was founded in 2020 by former F1 engineer Paddy Lowe, has developed a process it terms 'petrosynthesis' to create sustainable fuel and has set up a development plant in Bicester Heritage near Oxford. 

By 2021, the European Federation for Transport and Environment advised the aviation sector was needing e-kerosene to be deployed as it could substantially reduce the climate impact of aviation. It was also observing electrofuel usage in cars emits two significant greenhouse gases beyond  captured for the production: methane (CH4) and nitrous oxide (N2O); local air pollution was still a concern, and it was five times less efficient than direct electrification.

According to the eFuel Alliance, the perspective of the lack of efficiency of Electrofuels is misleading as what is critical for global energy transition is not the degree of efficiency of electricity’s end usage, but rather how efficiently electricity can be produced from renewable energies, and then made usable.

See also

References

Notes

External links
 

Alternative fuels
Renewable fuels
Aviation fuels